The 2015 Monterrey Open was a women's tennis tournament played on outdoor hard courts. It was the 7th edition of the Monterrey Open and an International tournament on the 2015 WTA Tour. It took place at the Club Sonoma in Monterrey, Mexico, from 2 to 8 March 2015.

Points and prize money

Point distribution

Prize money 

1Qualifiers prize money is also the Round of 32 prize money.
*per team

Singles main draw entrants

Seeds 

 Rankings as of February 23, 2015

Other entrants 
The following players received wildcards into the main draw:
  Jovana Jakšić
  Ana Sofía Sánchez
  Francesca Schiavone

The following players received entry from the qualifying draw:
  Urszula Radwańska
  Bethanie Mattek-Sands
  Nicole Vaidišová
  Tímea Babos

Withdrawals 
Before the tournament
  Eugenie Bouchard →replaced by Aleksandra Krunić 
  Irina-Camelia Begu (rib injury) →replaced by Sílvia Soler Espinosa
  Jana Čepelová →replaced by Ajla Tomljanović
  Jelena Janković →replaced by Shelby Rogers
  Mirjana Lučić-Baroni →replaced by Yanina Wickmayer
  Christina McHale →replaced by Johanna Larsson
  Monica Niculescu →replaced by Kiki Bertens
  Sloane Stephens →replaced by Lesia Tsurenko
  Coco Vandeweghe (shoulder injury) →replaced by Tereza Smitková
  Roberta Vinci →replaced by Kristina Mladenovic
  Shuai Zhang →replaced by Anna Schmiedlová

Retirements
  Magdaléna Rybáriková

Doubles main draw entrants

Seeds 

 Rankings as of February 23, 2015

Other entrants 
The following pairs received wildcards into the doubles main draw:
  Bethanie Mattek-Sands /  Monica Puig
  Victoria Rodríguez /  Marcela Zacarías

Retirements
  Timea Babos (lower back injury)

Champions

Singles 

  Timea Bacsinszky def.  Caroline Garcia 4–6, 6–2, 6–4

Doubles 

  Gabriela Dabrowski /  Alicja Rosolska def.  Anastasia Rodionova /  Arina Rodionova 6–3, 2–6, [10–3]

References

External links 
 Official website

2015 WTA Tour
2015
2015 in Mexican tennis